María Begoña Yarza Sáez (born 20 February 1964) is a Chilean politician and physician who served as Minister of Health.

References

External links
 

1964 births
Living people
University of Havana alumni
University of Chile alumni
Pompeu Fabra University alumni
21st-century Chilean politicians
Women government ministers of Chile